Macherla mandal is one of the 28 mandals in the Palnadu district of the Indian state of Andhra Pradesh. It is under the administration of Gurazala revenue division and the headquarters are located at Macherla. The mandal is bounded by Rentachintala, Durgi and Veldurthi mandals and a portion of the mandal also borders the state of Telangana.

Demographics 

 census, the mandal had a population of 160,303. The total population constitute, 57,140 males and 55,908 females —a sex ratio of 978 females per 1000 males. 13,486 children are in the age group of 0–6 years, of which 7,036 are boys and 6,450 are girls. The average literacy rate stands at 30.79% with 62,850 literates.

Governance 
The mandal is controlled by a tahsildar and the present tahsildar is G.Levi. Macherla mandal is one of the 3 mandals under Macherla (Assembly constituency), which in turn represents Narasaraopet (Lok Sabha constituency) of Andhra Pradesh.

Towns and villages 

 census, the mandal has 14 settlements. It includes 1 town, 13 villages. Macherla (M) is the only town in the mandal.

The settlements in the mandal are listed below:

Note: †–Mandal headquarter, M-Municipality

Education 

The mandal plays a major role in education for the rural students of the nearby villages. The primary and secondary school education is imparted by government, aided and private schools, under the School Education Department of the state. As per the school information report for the academic year 2015–16, the mandal has more than 18,587 students enrolled in over 105 schools.

See also 
 List of mandals in Andhra Pradesh
 Villages in Macherla mandal

References

Mandals in Guntur district